The Appalachian State Mountaineers baseball team is a varsity intercollegiate athletic team of Appalachian State University in Boone, North Carolina, United States. The team is a member of the Sun Belt Conference, which is part of NCAA Division I. Appalachian State's first baseball team was fielded in 1903.The team plays its home games at Beaver Field at Jim and Bettie Smith Stadium in Boone, North Carolina. The Mountaineers are coached by Kermit Smith.

Major League Baseball
Appalachian State has had 44 Major League Baseball Draft selections since the draft began in 1965.

See also
List of NCAA Division I baseball programs

References

External links